Pleasant Grove is a census-designated place (CDP) in Allegany County, Maryland, United States. As of the 2010 census it had a population of 353.

Pleasant Grove is located east of Cumberland along Maryland Route 144 (Baltimore Pike), the old alignment of U.S. Route 40. Interstate 68, the new highway alignment, also runs through the CDP, with access via Exit 47 at the western end of the community.

Demographics

References

Census-designated places in Allegany County, Maryland
Census-designated places in Maryland